Alan Cadogan (born 17 May 1993) is an Irish hurler who plays for Cork Senior Championship club Douglas and at inter-county level with the Cork senior hurling team. He usually lines out as a right corner-forward.

Playing career

Douglas

Cadogan joined the Douglas club at a young age and played in all grades at juvenile and underage levels. He enjoyed championship success in the under-14 and under-16 grades.

On 11 June 2011, Cadogan made his senior championship debut for Douglas when he came on as a 54th-minute substitute in a 0-09 to 1-14 defeat by Blackrock in the Cork Senior Championship.

Cork

Minor and under-21

Cadogan first played for Cork as a dual player at minor level. He made his first appearance for the Cork minor football team on 13 April 2011 in a 2-10 to 0-11 defeat of Clare in the Munster Championship. Cadogan made his debut with the Cork minor hurling team two weeks later in a 2-14 to 0-12 defeat by Limerick in the Munster Championship. On 3 July, he was at left corner-forward when the Cork minor football team suffered a 3-11 to 1-09 defeat by Tipperary in the Munster final.

On 11 April 2012, Cadogan made his first appearance for the Cork under-21 football team. He came on as a substitute for Mark Sugrue in the 2-12 to 1-14 Munster Championship final defeat of Kerry.

On 9 April 2011, Cadogan won his second Munster Championship medal when the Cork under-21 football team defeated Tipperary by 1-17 to 0-09 in the final. On 4 May, he scored a point from right wing-forward when Cork suffered a 1-14 to 1-11 defeat by Galway in the All-Ireland final. Cadogan became a dual player in the under-21 grade on 17 July when he lined out for the Cork under-21 hurling team in their 5-19 to 2-13 defeat by Tipperary in the Munster Championship.
 
Cadogan won a third successive Munster Championship medal with the Cork under-21 football team on 9 April 2014 when he scored five points from play in the 1-18 to 3-08 defeat of Tipperary in the final. On 30 July, he was held scoreless at full-forward when the Cork under-21 hurling team suffered a 1-28 to 1-13 defeat by Clare in the Munster Championship final.

Senior

Cadogan made his first appearance for the Cork senior hurling team on 15 February 2014 in a 0-17 apiece draw with Limerick in the  National Hurling League. He was later included on Cork's panel for the 2014 Munster Championship and made his debut on 25 May in a 1-21 apiece draw with Waterford, in which he was also named man of the match. On 3 July, Cadogan won a Munster Championship medal after scoring four points in Cork's 2-24 to 0-24 defeat of Limerick in the last final to be played at the old Páirc Uí Chaoimh. He ended the season by being nominated for an All-Star.

On 3 May 2015, Cadogan was at right corner-forward in Cork's 1-24 to 0-17 defeat by Waterford in the National League final.

Cadogan won his second Munster Championship medal on 9 July 2017 after scoring 1-04 from play in the 1-25 to 1-20 defeat of Clare in the final. He ended the season by securing a second All-Star nomination.

On 24 May 2018, it was reported that Cadogan would miss the Munster Championship after he underwent surgery on his knee the previous week. He returned to the extended panel and wore the number 27 jersey for Cork's All-Ireland semi-final defeat by Limerick on 29 July.

On 16 February 2019, Cadogan played his first game for Cork in eleven months when he came on as a 58th-minute substitute for Jamie Coughlan in Cork's 1-20 to 0-20 National League defeat of Clare. He ended the year by receiving a third All-Star nomination.

Munster

Cadogan was added to the Munster inter-provincial team during the 2016 Inter-provincial Championship. He made his only appearance for the team on 15 December 2016 when he came on as a half-time substitute for Brendan Maher and collected a Railway Cup medal following the 2-20 to 2-16 defeat of Leinster.

Coaching career

St. Francis College

On 16 February 2019, Cadogan was part of the coaching team when St. Francis College qualified for the final of the Tom Collum Cup. A 1-13 to 0-14 of Hamilton High School secured the title.

Career statistics

Club

Inter-county

Honours

Player

University College Cork
All-Ireland Freshers Hurling Championship (1): 2013
Canon O'Brien Cup (1): 2017

Cork
Munster Senior Hurling Championship (2): 2014, 2017
Munster Under-21 Football Championship (3): 2012, 2013, 2014

Munster
Railway Cup (1): 2016

Coach

St. Francis College
Tom Cullum Cup (1): 2019

References

External link

Alan Cadogan profile at the Cork GAA website

1993 births
Living people
Douglas hurlers
Douglas Gaelic footballers
UCC hurlers
Cork inter-county hurlers
Cork inter-county Gaelic footballers
Munster inter-provincial hurlers